Berry Spur is a mostly ice-covered spur in Antarctica, located between McDermott Glacier and Comberiate Glacier on the west side of the Royal Society Range, Victoria Land. It was named by the Advisory Committee on Antarctic Names after Russell D. Berry, United States Geological Survey cartographer, a member of the satellite surveying team at South Pole Station, winter party 1983.

References
 

Ridges of Victoria Land
Scott Coast